Giacomo Boni (25 April 1859 – 10 July 1925) was an Italian archaeologist specializing in Roman architecture. He is most famous for his work in the Roman Forum.

Life
Born in Venice, Boni studied architecture at the Accademia di Belle Arti in his native city and later moved to Rome. During World War I Boni participated as a soldier, and was elected senator in 1923, at which time he embraced fascism.

Boni died in Rome, and he is buried in the Orti Farnesiani on the Palatine Hill.

Work

Venice
His early work as an architect involved him in the restoration of the Doge's Palace. During this time he demonstrated his technical skills. In the 1880s, Boni met Horatio Brown, who became his colleague in a shared passion for antiquities.

Rome
In 1888 Boni went to Rome, where in 1898 the Ministro della Pubblica Istruzione G. Baccelli named him director of excavations in the Forum Romanum. Boni directed this important project from 1898 until his death in 1925. He was interested in the stratigraphy of the Forum, an important advance in the science of Roman archaeology.

His excavations led to many important discoveries, including the Iron Age necropolis near the Temple of Antoninus and Faustina, the Lapis Niger, the Regia, Galleria Cesaree, Horrea Agrippiana, the shrine of Vesta, and other monuments.  In 1907 Boni also worked on the slope of the Palatine Hill where he discovered the Mundus (tholos-cistern), a complex of tunnels leading to the Casa dei Grifi, the so-called Aula Isiaca, the so-called Baths of Tiberius and the base of a hut under the peristyle of the Domus Flavia.

The excavations were interrupted by the outbreak of World War I and resumed in 1916.

Roman religion and fascism
Boni developed a strong interest in the ancient Roman religion and wished to see it revived and some of its rituals restored and adopted by the Italian state. When the National Fascist Party came to power he viewed it as a chance for a pagan revival. He viewed fascism as connected to ancient Rome and agreed with Benito Mussolini's claim that fascism was a sort of continuation of the Roman Empire. Mussolini in turn supported Boni and appointed him as a senator. Boni's role in fascism would however not last long, as he died in 1925 and only lived through a few years of the fascist state. He was buried on the Palatine hill in an extraordinary ceremony organized by the regime. He is considered an early figure in what scholars later would label as "sacred fascism".

Selected publications

Further reading
Becker, J. A. 2014. "Giacomo Boni." in Encyclopedia of Global Archaeology, ed. by C. Smith, 989-90. Springer. doi https://doi.org/10.1007/978-1-4419-0465-2_1453
Whitehouse, David. "Boni, Giacomo", Encyclopedia of the History of Classical Archaeology.  Nancy Thomson de Grummond, ed.   Westport, CT:  Greenwood Press, 1996, vol. 1, pp. 171–72.
 Roma – I Fori Imperiali (1995-2008). Giacomo Boni and the Antiquarium Forense: Rediscovering an Ancient Museum (2004-2007). - a set on Flickr at www.flickr.com Martin G. Gonde, Rome - Roman Forum: Giacomo Boni and the Antiquarium Forense: Rediscovering an Ancient Museum (2004-2007).

References
 ROMA - I FORI IMPERIALI. The Documentation and Dissemination of the Recent Archaeological Investigations and Related Studies of the Imperial Fora of Rome (1995 – 2008). on F... at www.flickr.com Prof. Giacomo Boni, "The Public Library of the Forum Museum." THE TIMES (London), July 14, 1905, pg.4. From: Preface: Rome, the Imperial Fora, and Archaeology – ‘The Demanding and Difficult Work of the Archaeologists: To Excavate, Interpret, Classify and Inform.’ cf.  Martin G. Conde, ROMA - I FORI IMPERIALI. The Documentation and Dissemination of the Recent Archaeological Investigations and Related Studies of the Imperial Fora of Rome (1995 – 2007).
 P. Romanelli, s.v. “Boni Giacomo”, in Dizionario Biografico degli Italiani (Istituto dell’Enciclopedia Italiana fondata da Giovanni Treccani), Roma 1970, pp. 75–77
 A. Capodiferro, P. Fortini (a cura di), Gli scavi di Giacomo Boni al foro Romano, Documenti dall’Archivio Disegni della Soprintendenza Archeologica di Roma I.1 (Planimetrie del Foro Romano, Gallerie Cesaree, Comizio, Niger Lapis, Pozzi repubblicani e medievali), Roma 2003.
 Paola S. Salvatori, L’adozione del fascio littorio nella monetazione dell’Italia fascista, in «Rivista italiana di numismatica e scienze affini», CIX, 2008, pp. 333–352.
 Paola S. Salvatori,  Liturgie immaginate: Giacomo Boni e la romanità fascista, in "Studi Storici", LIII, 2012, 2, pp. 421–438.
 "Trajan's column." Proceedings of the British Academy, London (1907).  vol. 3  p. 93-98.
 Santa Maria dei Miracoli in Venezia. Venice: Stabilimento tipografico dei fratelli Vicentini, 1887.
 La torre de S. Marco: communicazione. s.l. : s.n., 1903.
 The Roman marmorarii.  Rome: s.n., 1893.
 "Il duomo di Parenzo ed i suoi mosaici." Archivio storico dell'Arte 7 (1894) [unnumbered, 28 pp.]

External links
P. Romanelli. "BONI, Giacomo." Dizionario Biografico degli Italiani - Volume 12 (1971)
Soprintendenza Speciale per i Beni Archeologici di Roma Palazzo Altemps Archivio di Documentazione Archeologica Archaeological Data Archives - Giacomo Boni

Notes

1859 births
1925 deaths
People from Venice
Italian archaeologists
20th-century archaeologists
Italian modern pagans
National Fascist Party politicians
Members of the Senate of the Kingdom of Italy